Eckert may refer to:

People
 Allan W. Eckert (1931–2011), American historical novelist
 Andrea Eckert (born 1958), Austrian actress
 Charles R. Eckert (1868–1959), U.S. congressman from Pennsylvania
 Ernst R. G. Eckert (1904–2004), German scientist
 Eckert number, dimensionless number used in flow calculations
 Eugen Eckert (born 1954) German minister, singer-songwriter and academic teacher
 Franz Eckert (1852–1916), German musician
 Fred J. Eckert (born 1941), U.S. congressman from New York
 Fritz Eckert (1852–1920), Swedish architect
 George Nicholas Eckert (1802–1865), U.S. congressman from Pennsylvania
 John Eckert (musician) (born 1939), American trumpeter
 J. Presper Eckert (1919–1995), American electrical engineer, co-inventor of ENIAC
 Eckert–Mauchly Computer Corporation
 Eckert–Mauchly Award
 Max Eckert-Greifendorff (1868–1938), German geographer
 Eckert projection, any of six map projections devised by Eckert-Greifendorff
 Karl Anton Eckert (1820–1879), German conductor and composer
 Lars Eckert (born 1983), German rugby union player
 Leon Eckert (born 1995), German politician
 Robb Eckert, American politician
 Robert A. Eckert (born 1954), American businessman
 Volker Eckert (1959–2007), German truck driver and serial killer
 Wallace John Eckert (1902–1971), German-American astronomer
 Eckert (crater), on the moon
 William Eckert (1909–1971), U.S. Air Force general and commissioner of Major League Baseball
 Win Scott Eckert, author

Characters on the television series General Hospital
 Bill Eckert
 Jenny Eckert
 Nancy Eckert
 Sly Eckert

Places
 Eckert, Colorado, a small town in the United States
 Eckert, Michigan, a historic settlement
 Eckert Building
 Eckert (crater), on the moon, named for American astronomer Wallace John Eckert

See also
 Ecker (surname)
Eckerle, a surname

Surnames from given names